The U.S. state of Utah has the solar potential to provide all of the electricity used in the United States. Utah is one of the seven states with the best potential for solar power, along with California, Nevada, Arizona, New Mexico, Colorado, and Texas. Utah allows net metering for residential systems up to 25 kW and up to 2 MW for non-residential users. Utah's renewable portfolio standard can best be described as a goal and calls for obtaining 20% of electricity from renewable sources by 2025 – if it is cost effective.

Since 2011, with the 30% federal tax credit, prices have decreased to the point that they provide an attractive return on investment. Utah allows up to 25% $2,000 tax credit for residential systems and up to 10% $50,000 credit for commercial systems. St. George offers a $2000/kW (AC) rebate of up to $6,000 for residential systems, and up to $20,000 for commercial systems. A similar offer from Rocky Mountain Power of $1.10/watt (AC) has been fully subscribed for 2016, and in March 2016 the program was terminated by the Utah Legislature Senate Bill SB0115.

Usage and production 
Utah's energy consumption consists of both fossil fuels and renewable resources.  In 2009, residents, business and industries combined, consumed approximately 27,411 gigawatt-hours (GWh) of electricity; 0.01% of which was solar generated. Of the total energy produced, in 2009 a fraction of 0.1% was solar generated.

Solar energy production via residential net-metering has increased steadily since 2008. From 2008 to 2009, the number of households participating in the program grew fivefold, placing Utah 18th, in the country.

According to Utah Governor Herbert's 10-Year Strategic Energy Plan, 72% of crude oil used in transportation, comes from out of state sources; pursuance of clean technology for nontraditional fuels is "critical to [Utah's] economy, air quality and quality of life".

Photovoltaics

Solar farms 

Many utility-scale (larger than about 2 MW) solar farms have been constructed in western Utah since 2015, servicing consumers in Utah and adjacent states.  The 240 MW Escalante Solar Project adjacent to Milford Wind in Beaver County is the largest facility as of year 2019.

Residential solar 
The Salt Lake Tribune reports that about 2,700 customers of Rocky Mountain Power had solar arrays as of May 2014; a number that is growing by 30% a year.

Rocky Mountain Power, subsidy of PacifiCorp and utility provider for the state of Utah, offers incentives between $0.60 and $1.25 per watt generated by participants in Net metering.

Solar thermal 

Utah has the potential to generate 1,500,000 GWh/year from 826 GW of concentrated solar power (CSP) plants using 6,371 square miles - about 7.5% of the state. CSP has the advantage over photovoltaics of integrating storage, allowing 24-hour operation, and allowing the hourly output to track demand, with the balance stored as heat. CSP is not able to compensate for seasonal changes, although in the southwest peak demand correlates with peak solar output, due to air conditioning loads. Utah is one of 11 states each able to provide all of the electricity used in the United States from CSP.

State legislation 
Utah's solar easement provisions are similar to those in other states, in that parties may voluntarily enter into written contracts, enforceable by law, that once created run with the land. However, The Utah Public Service Commission plans to execute a cost-benefit analysis of consumer-produced electricity and its effects on the current electrical system.  This study may set national precedent, as no state's regulatory agency has conducted a full-scale examination of net-metered solar power. The study does not consider the benefits of clean energy on health and the environment. It evaluates the solar-generated energy as if it were generated by coal, the major source of power in Utah. Many eastern states do value their clean energy with cap-and-trade legislation. Utah also provides a nonrefundable and refundable tax credit for qualifying solar projects.

A bill in the Utah Senate, SB0115 sponsored by Senator Stuart J. Adams, put an end to the Rocky Mountain Power Solar Incentive Program in March 2016. The bill was titled "Sustainable Transportation and Energy Plan Act" but contained language that lacked support for solar energy, even after several amendments. Some claim that the complex bill was aimed to bypass the oversight of the Public Service Commission and allow a path to make rooftop solar unattractive. The Senate bill failed a vote in the House of Representatives late in the afternoon of the last day the legislature was in session, and solar proponents were relieved. But later that night 'after dinner' the bill was brought back to the House for 'reconsideration' by Representative V. Lowry Snow, and after further dialogue from Representative Snow, another vote was taken in the House of Representatives and this time the bill passed. KSL article "House approves resurrected Rocky Mountain Power bill"

A previous attempt to change the Solar Net Metering agreement for Rocky Mountain Power was rejected by the Utah Public Service Commission.  This brings into question the support for rooftop solar in Utah by the state's largest utility Rocky Mountain Power, which is now owned by Warren Buffett's Berkshire Hathaway Energy (BHE).

 "Buffett Says He Loves Renewables, So Why Is His Company Trying To Kill Solar Energy?"
 "Warren Buffett’s Energy Company Says Net Metering Should Be ‘Eliminated’"

Utah's solar access law 
Under Utah Code, Title 10, Chapter 9a, Section 610, provides land use authorities the power to refuse approval or renewal of homeowner association or other private covenants that prohibit "reasonably sited and designed solar collectors, clotheslines, or other energy devices based".

Solar easements 
Voluntary solar easements may be created by property owners to protect long-term access to sunlight.  Easements must be "created in writing and shall be filed, duly recorded and indexed in the office of the recorder of the county in which the easement is granted".

Utah Science Technology and Research Initiative (USTAR) 
The passage of Utah State Bill 75 in 2006 allocated $179 million to the USTAR Economic Development Initiative, $15 million in ongoing annual funding to research teams at the University of Utah and Utah State University and $160 million towards the construction of new research facilities.

Included in this appropriation is funding for alternative and renewable energy research, including catalysis and solar technologies. Resulting new bioengineering companies include Binergy Scientific, Nanosynth Materials and Sensors, and Nanosynth Energy Technologies.

Economic impacts 
From fiscal years 2007 through 2011, USTAR generated more than $700 million in jobs-related earnings, gross state product, state tax revenue and local tax revenue, as outlined in the table below from 2012 report by the Bureau of Economic and Business Research at the David Eccles School of Business at the University of Utah

Construction 
Construction spending for USTAR research facilities has had the largest economic impacts to the state, supporting an average of 801 jobs annually, and generated $143.2 million in Utah jobs earnings.  Both facilities, the BioInnovations Center at Utah State University and the Sorenson Molecular Biotechnology Building at the University of Utah, are LEED Gold certified.

Sorenson Molecular Biotechnology Building 

Officially dedicated in 2012, the James L. Sorenson Molecular Biotechnology Building is part of a four-building quadrangle. The 208,000-square-foot building features a transparent design, enabling natural light to enter 75% of the interiors.  Built to LEED Gold certification standards, the facility will reduce energy and use costs by nearly 40%.  Sustainable features include multistage evaporative cooling systems and low volatile organic compound finishes.  Vegetated bioswales, incorporated in the landscaping, collect and filter surface runoff.

A total of 33,000 cubic yards of concrete and 6.8 million pounds of reinforcing steel were used in the construction of the building.  Concrete used features high fly ash content.  Local, renewably sourced stone and copper were also used in construction.

Training efforts 
After a ranking of 34th in the nation, Utah has taken greater steps to produce green jobs within the state. The creation of Intermountain Weatherization Training center in Clearfield has trained thousands of new workers for green jobs throughout the state, including certified solar installation. The goal of the 14,000-square-foot facility is to use hands-on training with state-of-the-art equipment to train workers in accordance to the U.S. Department of Energy guidelines for home energy professionals. The Intermountain Weatherization Center (IWC) is funded from private contributions, donations, grants, fees, any money appropriated by the Legislature.

Solar energy zones 
On April 20, 2012, the Bureau of Land Management identified 17 "Solar Energy Zones" with the best potential for priority solar development. Three of those are in Utah. In addition to the Solar Energy Zones, 18,098,040 acres is available in Utah for solar application permits from the BLM, plus 1,962,671 acres with a variance.

 Escalante Valley - 6,533 acres (26.4 km²) 588 - 1,058 MW 
 Milford Flats South - 6,252 acres (25.3 km²) 576 - 1,037 MW 
 Wah Wah Valley 5,873 acres (23.8 km²) 542 - 976 MW

Planned projects

Utah Solar 1 
Energy Capital Group, LLC (ECG) is developing ECG Utah Solar 1, LLC, a 300 MW-AC PV solar plant strategically sited to use existing interstate transmission infrastructure on 1754 acres leased from the Utah School and Institutional Trust Lands (SITLA) less than one mile from the Intermountain Power Project (IPP) north of Delta, Utah.

The project's planned interconnection point is the IPP switchyard which is a point of delivery for the Los Angeles, Anaheim, Riverside, Pasadena, Glendale and Burbank utilities. The switchyard connects to the Southern Transmission System (STS) the 500 HVDC line (Path 27) that travels 488 miles directly to a switchyard in Adelanto, California. LADWP is a California balancing authority and operates the switchyard which makes this project as though it is on California soil for the state Renewable Portfolio Standard (RPS).

Utah Olympic Oval Solar Project 

The Utah Olympic Oval plans to install more than 3,000 solar panels above parking stalls that will generate some of the power needed to operate the facility. Current project estimates predict the addition of solar panels to save the facility $100,000 of its $750,000 annual power costs.

At a cost of $1.4 million, the Utah Olympic Oval Solar Project is largest solar project to date of the Utah state Division of Construction and Facilities Management and is expected to pay for itself in five years and end up saving $3.7 million over its 20-year life.

SunSmart Solar Farm 
SunSmart is a project in St. George to provide residents an opportunity to take advantage of community solar farm. The purchaser is not required to set anything up and there is no maintenance making it a simple risk-free investment. With this program, participants pay $2.95 more per month for each 100 kWh block of power, a cost increase from $.0671/kWh to $.0966/kWh. These payments help cover the building costs of renewable energy sources, which are typically greater than traditional, carbon-based sources of power. The revenue from this program will allow further development and research for other renewable sources

See also 
 Wind power in Utah
 Solar power in the United States
 Renewable energy in the United States

References

External links 

 Policies and Incentives
 Utah Solar Energy Association

Energy in Utah
Utah
Solar power in Utah